This is the list of naval and maritime flags of Poland.

Jack

Naval ensign

Ensigns of auxiliary vessels of the Navy

Flags of ships of Border Guard

Ensigns of civilian ships

Other Navy flags

Rank flags used in all branches of the Armed Forces

Rank flags

Rank pennants

Special state service vessels

Yachting

References

See also
 List of Polish flags
 Mazurek Dąbrowskiego

Maritime flags
Naval and maritime
Naval and maritime
Polish